Lam Lay Yong (maiden name Oon Lay Yong, ; born 1936) is a retired Professor of Mathematics.

Academic career
From 1988 to 1996 she was Professor at the Department of Mathematics, National University of Singapore (NUS). She graduated from the University of Malaya  (later becoming University of Singapore) in 1957 and pursued graduate study in Cambridge University, obtaining her Ph.D. degree from  University of Singapore in 1966, and becoming a lecturer at the University of Singapore. She was promoted to full professor in 1988, taught in NUS for 35 years, and retired in 1996.

From 1974 to 1990, Lam Lay Yong was the associate editor of Historia Mathematica. Lam was a member of Académie Internationale d'Histoire des Sciences.

In 2001, Lam Lay Yong was awarded the Kenneth O. May Prize jointly with Ubiratan D'Ambrosio. Lam was the first Asian and first woman to receive this award. Her reception speech was Ancient Chinese Mathematics and its influence on World Mathematics.

Lam Lay Yong also won the 2005 Outstanding Science Alumni Award from NUS. She is the granddaughter of Tan Kah Kee and niece of Lee Kong Chian.

Chinese origins of Hindu-Arabic Numerals Hypothesis
Lam Lay Yong has hypothesised that Hindu–Arabic numeral system originated in China based on her comparative studies on Chinese counting rods system. She states that the rod numerals and the hindu numerals have a few in common, that they're nine signs, concept of zero, a place value system, and decimal base. She claims that, "While no one knows how the Hindu-Arabic system originates in India, on the other hand, there is strong evidence of a transmission of the concept of the rod system to India." She even claims that there is no unquestionable evidence that the system originated in India, and that she claims that there are two factors concerning this. One was from mathematician's mention, for example a critique of Severus Sebokht on Indian ingenuity, and Al-Khwarizmi's book on Hindu Calculation. The other factor is the presence of Brahmi numerals.

However Michel Danino criticised this by saying that Lam Lay Yong's evidence for this was not at all evidence-based nor rigorous, and that she is ill-qualified for crosscultural studies. According to Michael Danino Her thesis has not been  accepted, thus, the Chinese origin of Hindu-Arabic numerals remains to be hypothetical, and not widely accepted at all. All of this seems to contradict Yong's claims that there is strong evidence of rod numerals in India.

Publication
Jiu Zhang Suanshu (1994) "(Nine Chapters on the Mathematical Art): An Overview, Archive for History of Exact Sciences, vol. 47: pp. 1–51.
Zhang Qiujian Suanjing (1997) "(The Mathematical Classic of Zhang Qiujian): An Overview", Archive for History of Exact Sciences, vol. 50: pp. 201–240.
 Lam Lay Yong, Ang Tian Se (2004) Fleeting Footsteps. Tracing the Conception of Arithmetic and Algebra in Ancient China, Revised Edition, World Scientific, Singapore.
Lam Lay Yong (1977) A Critical Study of the Yang Hui suan fa, NUS Press.
Lam Lay Yong, "A Chinese Genesis, Rewriting the history of our numeral system", Archive for History of Exact Sciences 38: 101–108.
Lam Lay Yong (1966) "On the Chinese Origin of the Galley Method of Arithmetical Division", The British Journal for the History of Science 3: 66–69 Cambridge University Press.
Lam Lay Yong (1996)  "The Development of Hindu-Arabic and Traditional Chinese Arithmetic", Chinese Science 13: 35–54.
Oon Lay Yong (2009) Arithmetic in Ancient China OCT October 2009.
Lam Lay-Yong and Shen Kangshen (沈康身) (1989) "Methods of solving linear equations in traditional China", Historia Mathematica, Volume 16, Issue 2, Pages 107–122.

References

External links
Faculty of Science, NUS, Lam Lay Yong
Chinese Invented Number System: Singapore Researcher
An Interview with Lam Lay Yong - Singapore Mathematical Society
Views on Mathematics Education in Singapore

Historians of mathematics
Academic staff of the National University of Singapore
Living people
Singaporean mathematicians
Singaporean people of Hokkien descent
Singaporean people of Chinese descent
1936 births
National University of Singapore alumni